Reyna Roberts (born August 15, 1997) is an American country singer-songwriter and pianist. She is known for her July 2020 debut single, "Stompin' Grounds" as well as multiple appearances on NFL's Monday Night Football.

One of the few visible Black women in country music, Roberts is known for advocating for "acknowledging the past" of country music, which includes acknowledging Black artist mentors such as Lesley Riddle, and learning the history of the banjo and the term "Music City" for Nashville.

Early life 
Roberts was born in Alaska and raised in Alabama and California. Both of her parents were combat engineers in the Army. She was born two months premature, weighing two pounds; when her family heard that she might have cognitive, physical, visual and vocal developmental issues, they used music to aid her brain development.

The first time Roberts performed music was at the age of three, when her mother took her to a karaoke bar in Alaska. When she was 10 years old, her family lost their home but paid for a storage unit to store her piano so Roberts could continue practicing the instrument. She continued playing in the family storage unit for three years.

Reyna moved with her parents multiple times in her childhood, living in Alaska, Alabama, Tennessee and California. Their move to California was to further her music career, not because of her parents' work.

Throughout high school Roberts competed on her high school wrestling team, and she began songwriting to woo the captain of the team. She recorded the resulting song, "Lying to Myself," in 2014. In 2016, she released the EP "The Beginning," which included the song "I'm Coming For Ya" and went on the Spring High School Nation Tour. She toured around the U.S. and opened for the Plain White T's.

Roberts had her first vocal lessons at 18 and since has trained with world-famous vocal coach Brett Manning.

Career 
Roberts lived between Nashville and Los Angeles from 2018 to 2020, going to songwriting camps to learn the craft and network with other songwriters and artists, and she met her current managers, Ryan McMahan and Larry Pareigis, during this period. She permanently relocated to Nashville in March 2020.

In June 2020, country-music singer Mickey Guyton posted a video of Roberts performing a cover of Carrie Underwood's song "Drinking Alone." Carrie Underwood retweeting the video gave Roberts industry recognition and starting traction in the country-music business. In July 2020, Roberts released "Stompin' Grounds," which was co-written and produced by Noah Henson.

Roberts joined CMT's Next Women in Country 2021 class along with Ashland Craft, Priscilla Block, Brittney Spencer, Hannah Dasher, MacKenzie Porter, Harper Grae, Tenille Arts, Sacha, and Chapel Hart. In March 2021, she was named one of RADIO.COM's "Leading Ladies" of Country Music.

She toured with Jamey Johnson on his 2021 summer tour, opening for him in seven cities in the Deep South. In August, she performed in her first festival in Washington State at the Watershed Fest.

In August 2021, Roberts signed on with Nashville-based publishing company Eclipse Music Group.

In October 2021, Roberts was featured in Amazon Music's "Breakthrough Country Live" initiative.

Advocacy 
In addition to her music career, Roberts has fundraised for military service members and veterans, as well as Rett Syndrome Awareness, The Wounded Warrior Project, Teen Impact Affiliates, and the Empowerment Project. She and her family are in the process of founding an organization to support homeless veterans.

Artistry 
Roberts has cited Carrie Underwood, Chris Stapleton, Gretchen Wilson and Rihanna among her musical influences.

After moving to Nashville in 2020, Roberts has written and performed with the likes of Jamey Johnson.

Discography

Singles

Extended Plays

External links 
 Reyna Roberts - YouTube YouTube Page
 Black, Female and Carving Out Their Own Path in Country Music
 CMT Next Women of Country 2021
"Country Artist Reyna Roberts Has Been a Fighter Since Birth: 'There's Always Been a Fire in Me'" People Magazine Interview

References 

African-American country musicians
American women country singers
American country singer-songwriters
Living people
African-American women musicians
1997 births
21st-century African-American people
21st-century African-American women